ISO 3166-2:ZA is the entry for South Africa in ISO 3166-2, part of the ISO 3166 standard published by the International Organization for Standardization (ISO), which defines codes for the names of the principal subdivisions (e.g., provinces or states) of all countries coded in ISO 3166-1.

ZA hails from Dutch: Zuid-Afrikaanse. Currently for South Africa, ISO 3166-2 codes are defined for 9 provinces.

Each code consists of two parts, separated by a hyphen. The second part consists of two or three letters indicating the province.

Current codes
Subdivision names are listed as in the ISO 3166-2 standard published by the ISO 3166 Maintenance Agency (ISO 3166/MA).

ISO 639 codes are used to represent subdivision names in the following administrative languages:
 (en): English
 (af): Afrikaans
 (nr): Ndebele
 (nso): Pedi
 (st): Sotho
 (ss): Swati
 (ts): Tsonga
 (tn): Tswana
 (ve): Venda
 (xh): Xhosa
 (zu): Zulu

Click on the button in the header to sort each column.

Changes
The following changes to the entry have been announced in newsletters by the ISO 3166/MA since the first publication of ISO 3166-2 in 1998:

The following changes to the entry are listed on ISO's online catalogue, the Online Browsing Platform:

See also
 Subdivisions of South Africa
 FIPS region codes of South Africa

External links
 ISO Online Browsing Platform: ZA
 Provinces of South Africa, Statoids.com

2:ZA
Lists of provinces of South Africa